Petar Angelov (born 26 December 1943) is a Bulgarian alpine skier. He competed at the 1964 Winter Olympics and the 1968 Winter Olympics.

References

External links
 

1943 births
Living people
Bulgarian male alpine skiers
Olympic alpine skiers of Bulgaria
Alpine skiers at the 1964 Winter Olympics
Alpine skiers at the 1968 Winter Olympics
People from Samokov
Sportspeople from Sofia Province